1989 in Korea may refer to:
1989 in North Korea
1989 in South Korea